The 2017 COSAFA Women's Championship was an international football tournament for national teams organised by COSAFA, teams from Southern Africa. The 2017 edition took place between 13 and 24 September 2017 in Bulawayo, Zimbabwe.

The tournament was won by South Africa.

Participants
Twelve teams took part in the competition 11 of the 14 COSAFA members and Kenya as invited guest from East Africa.

Venues

Draw
The draw took place on 23 August 2017 at 2pm.

Group stage
 All times are Central Africa Time (UTC+2).

Group A

Group B

Group C

Knockout stage

Semi-finals

Bronze medal match

Final

Statistics

Goalscorers

Awards
Player of the Tournament was South Africa’s Chrestinah Kgatlana. Golden Boot winner was Zimbabwe's Rutendo Makore with 10 goals. Zimbabwe goalkeeper Chido Dzingirai won the Golden Glove award
The Fair Play award was given to Kenya.

References

External links
Official website

COSAFA Women's Championship
2017 in African football
2017 in Zimbabwean sport
2017 in women's association football
International association football competitions hosted by Zimbabwe
2017 in Zimbabwean women's sport